The 1929 Liège–Bastogne–Liège was the 19th edition of the Liège–Bastogne–Liège cycle race and was held on 9 May 1929. The race started and finished in Liège. The race was won by Alphonse Schepers.

General classification

References

1929
1929 in Belgian sport